The 2011-12 Scottish League Championship (or 2012-13 RBS Scottish League Championship for sponsorship reasons) was the 38th season of formal domestic rugby union leagues in Scotland. The season was contested between August 2011 and April 2012, with Melrose RFC winning their eighth Championship and Gala RFC winning the Cup.

Scottish Premiership, 2011-2012

Scottish National Leagues, 2011-2012

Rugby in Scotland